Anne or Ann Cook may refer to:

Ann Cook (cookery book writer), English cookery book writer
Ann Cook (musician) (died 1962), American blues and gospel singer
Ann Cook (soccer) (born 1974), American soccer coach and former professional soccer player
Ann Turner Cook (1926–2022), American educator, mystery writer, Gerber baby logo model
Ann Cooke, English gentlewoman and scholar
Ann Jordan (born 1935), née Cook, director of corporations and non-profit foundations 
Anne Owers (born 1947), married name Cook, Chief Inspector of Prisons